The Best of Bette may refer to:

 The Best of Bette (1978 album) Bette Midler compilation album
 The Best of Bette (1981 album) Bette Midler compilation album
 The Best Bette (2008 album) Bette Midler compilation album

See also
 Bette (disambiguation)
 The Best Bet (突然发财) 2004 film
 Best Bet (迎妻接福) 2007 TV series